Herbert Vivian (3 April 1865 – 18 April 1940) was an English journalist, author and newspaper owner, who befriended Lord Randolph Churchill, Charles Russell, Leopold Maxse and others in the 1880s. He campaigned for Irish Home Rule and was private secretary to Wilfrid Blunt, poet and writer, who stood in the 1888 Deptford by-election. Vivian's writings caused a rift between Oscar Wilde and James NcNeil Whistler. In the 1890s, Vivian was a leader of the Neo-Jacobite Revival, a monarchist movement keen to restore a Stuart to the British throne and replace the parliamentary system. Before the First World War he was friends with Winston Churchill and was the first journalist to interview him. Vivian lost as Liberal candidate for Deptford in 1906. As an extreme monarchist throughout his life, he became in the 1920s a supporter of fascism. His several books included the novel The Green Bay Tree with William Henry Wilkins. He was a noted Serbophile; his writings on the Balkans remain influential.

Early life and education
Herbert Vivian was born on 3 April 1865 in Chichester, the only son of the Reverend Francis Henry and Margaret Vivian. He was baptised by his father on 11 May 1865 at the town's Church of St Peter the Great. He had a sister, Margaret Cordelia Vivian. His grandfather John Vivian was the Liberal MP for Truro, and owned Pencalenick House in St Clement, Cornwall; Herbert recalled shooting his first rabbit there as a child. He always glossed over his grandfather's political role, for example, writing: "None of my immediate relatives have ever troubled their heads in politics..." in his newspaper The Whirlwind.

Herbert studied at Harrow School from 1879 until 1883. When he was 14, he was introduced to an old friend of his father's, Thomas Hughes, the author of Tom Brown's School Days. The meeting had a strong impact on the young Vivian, who wrote about it later in his memoirs. In 1881, his grandfather introduced him to Thomas Bayley Potter, the Member of Parliament for Rochdale. Potter was impressed by Vivian and often took him into Parliament during his holidays. There Vivian met many of the MPs and was particularly impressed by Charles Warton, the MP for Bridport. Potter also introduced him to Lord Randolph Churchill, who inspired Vivian to take up Tory democracy. Vivian exchanged letters with Lord Randolph during his school days and continued to correspond with him for many years afterwards. Vivian later became friends with his son, Winston Churchill.

Vivian studied at Trinity College, Cambridge, graduating in 1886 with a degree in history and subsequently being promoted to a Master of Arts. In his student years, Vivian and his friend Edward Goulding were the President and Vice-President respectively of the University Carlton Club and invited Lord Randolph to become its President. Never shy of using his connections, Vivian dropped Churchill's name to arrange a meeting in Vevey with Nubar Pasha, the first Prime Minister of Egypt. After spending several hours discussing politics with Pasha, he returned to London and reported his conversation to Churchill. Churchill introduced Vivian to Charles Russell, who later became Baron Russell of Killowen and the Lord Chief Justice of England, and the two became friends.

At Cambridge, Vivian struck up friendships with students who went on to be prominent politicians and businessmen. Austen Chamberlain was involved in Cambridge Union politics when Vivian arrived and the two bonded over a shared interest in Radicalism. He was a close friend of Leopold Maxse — later editor of the National Review. Another friend was Ernest Debenham, who went on to lead the family business Debenhams to great commercial success. Vivian recalled Debenham overdosing on hashish during experiments in Buddhism at Cambridge.

Private secretary to Wilfrid Blunt
Vivian and Chamberlain organised speaking events at the Union. In 1886, they invited the English anti-imperialist writer and poet Wilfrid Scawen Blunt to speak on the subject of Irish Home Rule, and Vivian and Blunt became friends. Later that year, Vivian visited Blunt at his home, Crabbet Park, and took a position as his private secretary. Vivian spent most weekends at Crabbet during his final year of studies, and continued to work for Blunt after he graduated. While so employed, he met influential politicians, as Blunt prepared to stand for Parliament, among them the Anglo-French historian Hilaire Belloc. Blunt was a cousin of Lord Alfred Douglas and a friend of Oscar Wilde.

In 1887 Blunt became more vociferously in favour of Irish Home Rule. In November, Lord Randolph wrote to Vivian advising him to distance himself from Blunt, advice Vivian did not take. At the time, Blunt was also developing interest in the Jacobite cause of restoring the House of Stuart to the British throne, which Vivian was to become a passion in his life.

In late 1887, Vivian left the Conservative Party and joined the Home Rule Union between the Liberal Party and the Irish Parliamentary Party. At the end of the year, he toured Ireland with the leading Irish politician Michael Davitt and Bradford Central MP George Shaw-Lefevre. Shortly after Vivian returned from Ireland he met the leader of the Irish Parliamentary Party Charles Stewart Parnell and then the MP for East Mayo, John Dillon. In October 1887, Blunt gave a speech at a meeting in Woodford, County Galway protesting against mass evictions of tenant families. The meeting had been banned by Arthur Balfour, the Chief Secretary for Ireland and Blunt was arrested, tried and imprisoned. While Blunt served his sentence in Dublin, Vivian worked closely with William John Evelyn to promote Blunt in the February 1888 Deptford by-election, caused by Evelyn's resignation as the Conservative MP. Blunt lost by 275 votes. Despite this, Blunt and Vivian were approached in March 1888 by a committee from Parnell's Irish National League, asking Blunt to stand as their candidate for Deptford at the next general election, but by the time the election was called in 1892, Blunt's enthusiasms had moved on.

For a while, Vivian contributed to Evelyn's Abinger Monthly Record, a magazine he later described as "[in] part... really scurrilous attacks on the Vicar". The Vicar was Rev. T. P. Hill, incumbent of Abinger, who had fallen out with Evelyn. The Record was also noted for a campaign against compulsory vaccinations and support of Irish Home Rule.

Oscar Wilde
In the late 1880s, Vivian was a friend of Oscar Wilde; they dined together on several occasions. At one such dinner, Vivian claimed he witnessed a famous exchange between Wilde and James NcNeill Whistler. Whistler said a bon mot that Wilde found particularly witty, Wilde exclaimed that he wished that he had said it, and Whistler retorted, "You will, Oscar, you will".

In 1889, Vivian included this anecdote in an article, "The Reminiscences of a Short Life", which appeared in The Sun and implied that Wilde had a habit of passing off other people's witticisms as his own, especially Whistler's. Wilde saw Vivian's article as a scurrilous betrayal and it directly caused the break in friendship between Wilde and Whistler. "The Reminiscences" also caused acrimony between Wilde and Vivian, Wilde accusing him of "the inaccuracy of an eavesdropper with the method of a blackmailer" and banishing him from his circle. After the incident, Vivian and Whistler became friends, exchanging letters for many years.

Newspaper publishing and the Neo-Jacobite Revival
The late 1880s and 1890s brought a Neo-Jacobite Revival in Britain. In 1886, Bertram Ashburnham founded the Order of the White Rose, which embraced causes such as Irish, Cornish, Scottish and Welsh independence, Spanish and Italian legitimism, and particularly Jacobitism. Its members included Frederick Lee, Henry Jenner, Whistler, Robert Edward Francillon, Charles Augustus Howell, Stuart Richard Erskine and Vivian. It published a paper, The Royalist, from 1890 to 1903.

Vivian first met Erskine when they were at a journalism school together. In 1890, the two founded a weekly newspaper The Whirlwind, A Lively and Eccentric Newspaper with Vivian as editor, noted for including illustrations by artists, including Whistler and Walter Sickert. Sickert was also its art critic, and wrote a weekly column. It carried articles on Oscar Wilde at the height of his fame and notoriety. The paper espoused an individualist, Jacobite political view, championed by Erskine and Vivian. One notable Sickert illustration for The Whirlwind was a portrait of Charles Bradlaugh. Bradlaugh also wrote an article on "practical individualism" for the paper.

The Whirlwind was scourged by Victor Yarros for its anti-Semitic stance, mainly espoused by Vivian in his editorials. In the 23 August 1890 edition, he wrote, "The Jews are a race rather than a religious body, and, like the Chinese, are often obnoxious to their neighbours. By their financial craft they have acquired a dangerously extensive power, not merely over individuals, but even over the policy of states.... The proper way to deal with Jews is a rigorous boycott... What should be aimed at is a return of the whole Jewish race, as speedily as may be, to Palestine... The countries of their adoption would assuredly have no difficulty in sparing them".

Vivian used his editorship to promote also an individualist philosophy for women, though he was against Women's suffrage. Other causes included the menace of London's tramways and repeated attacks on the journalist and explorer Henry Morton Stanley and other figures of the age. He also published a series of autobiographical articles, Reminiscences of a Short Life, which later formed the basis of his 1923 memoirs, Myself Not Least, being the personal reminiscences of "X." The paper went on hiatus in early 1891, when Vivian stood for election, and did not restart publication.

The Order of the White Rose split in 1891. It had been a primarily nostalgic, artistic organisation, but Vivian and Erskine wanted a more militant political agenda. With Melville Henry Massue, styling himself the Marquis of Ruvigny, they founded a rival Legitimist Jacobite League of Great Britain and Ireland, sometimes using the name White Rose League. Its Central Executive Committee contained Walter Clifford Mellor, Vivian, George G. Fraser, Massue, Baron Valdez of Valdez, Alfred John Rodway, and R. W. Fraser, with Erskine as President. Pittock called the League a "publicist for Jacobitism on a scale unwitnessed since the Eighteenth Century".

The League organised protests often centred on statues of Jacobite heroes. In late 1892, they applied for government permission to lay wreaths at the statue of Charles I at Charing Cross on the anniversary of his execution. This was denied by Prime Minister Gladstone and enforced by George Shaw-Lefevre, Vivian's one-time travelling companion and now First Commissioner of Works. The League tried to lay the wreaths anyway on 30 January 1893. Police were sent to stop this, but after a confrontation, Vivian and other members were allowed to complete their moved, so gaining significant press coverage. The political reporter for the Lancashire Evening Post wrote, "Mr. Herbert Vivian has been successful at last in placing a wreath upon the Statue of Charles the First.... We trust all parties will feel the better for the operation — especially the bronze statue". An article in the Western Morning News said, "A bold and daring man is Mr. Herbert Vivian, Jacobite and journalist.... He announces to all and sundry that, law or no law, he will... attempt to lay a wreath on the statue. I have not heard whether special precautions have yet been taken to cope with this new force of disorder though, perhaps... one constable may be set apart to overawe Mr. Herbert Vivian".

In June 1893 came a split between Ruvigny and Vivian, with Vivian seeking to continue the League with support from Viscount Dupplin, Mellor and others. Vivian left the Jacobite League in August 1893, but continued to promote a strongly Jacobite political philosophy.

In 1892 and 1893, Vivian worked as a journalist for William Ernest Henley at the National Observer. In 1894, he published The Green Bay Tree with a college friend, the anti-immigrant writer William Henry Wilkins. He also contributed to Wilkin's monthly periodical The Albemarle, which was co-edited by a mutual Cambridge friend, Hubert Crackanthorpe. He spent the winter of 1894/1895 in France, where he discussed Jacobite and Carlist politics with the poet François Coppée and contemporary literature with the novelist Émile Zola.

Vivian continued his political journalism after The Whirlwind closed. In 1895, he was editor of The White Cockade, a newspaper whose main purpose was to put forward the Jacobite argument. It received poor reviews and no success. Vivian was described in the Bristol Mercury as a "volatile young gentleman [who] enjoys a European reputation in the spheres of politics and literature."

By 1897, Vivian was the President of the Legitimist Club, another Neo-Jacobite organisation. In 1898, Vivian published letters he had exchanged with the Office of Works demanding that the Club be allowed to lay a wreath at the Statue of James II, Trafalgar Square on 16 September, the anniversary of James' death. Vivian's wreath-laying, tactics and use of the press to publicise his cause, remained the same. Vivian remained president of the Club until at least 1904.

Writing career

After his departure from the Jacobite League in 1893, Vivian became travel correspondent of Arthur Pearson's paper Pearson's Weekly. In February 1896, he launched and edited a new weekly called Give and Take, which was noted for offering its readers coupons for "a selected set of tradesmen".

In 1898, Vivian returned to being a travel journalist, first for the Morning Post (1898–1899) and then for Pearson's newly-founded Daily Express (1899–1900). In 1901 and 1902, he produced a magazine called The Rambler with Richard Le Gallienne, intended as a revival of Samuel Johnson's periodical of the same name. After the turn of the 20th century, Vivian wrote several novels, some anonymously or using pseudonyms, which met mixed reviews. The Master Sinner was seen by The Publisher's Circular as "unpleasant but clever", and in The Literary World as having a "style... jerky and overladen with adjectives", but still "a readable book".

Of Vivian's several travel books, the best-known was Servia: The Poor Man's Paradise (1897), which was widely quoted in newspapers, including The New York Times, the Morning Post and Pearson's Weekly.

In 1901, Vivian wrote with his wife Olive a book on European religious rituals, described in the Sheffield Independent as "well written, curious and readable, and marred only by a singularly fatuous surrender to any form of superstition however grovelling". In 1902, Vivian interviewed the French novelist Joris-Karl Huysmans.

In 1903, Vivian returned to the subject of Serbia in "The Servian Character" for the English Illustrated Magazine. He followed this with a second work, The Servian Tragedy: With Some Impressions of Macedonia (1904), detailing the coup d'état against the Serbian royal family. This was reviewed in the Sheffield Daily Telegraph: "The author has a thorough personal knowledge of the country, was received in audience by the late King and Queen, and is personally acquainted with all the statesmen. The Belgrade catastrophe is minutely described from full particulars obtained first hand." It was reviewed less positively in the London Daily News: "Mr. Herbert Vivian's new book... presents many interesting chapters on the events leading up to the recent tragedy, but can hardly be looked upon as an authoritative history. The matter is thin, the author does not quote his authorities; and he is too evidently willing to accept hearsay in place of evidence."

Vivian, as a friend of Winston Churchill, met him several times in the 1900s, seeking political gossip and advice. In 1905 Vivian published the first interview given by Churchill, published in The Pall Mall Magazine, which received attention in the press. Vivian also interviewed David Lloyd George, the President of the Board of Trade, for The Pall Mall Magazine and wrote for The Fortnightly Review.

In 1904, Vivian made a political speech containing pointed remarks about George Bernard Shaw. Shaw and Vivian exchanged letters on the matter, which Vivian then published, to Shaw's chagrin:
The publication of my letter to Mr. Vivian was a piece of humourous cruelty in which I had no part. I honestly gave Mr. Vivian the best advice I could in his own interest in a letter obviously not intended for publication; and if he had acted quietly upon it, instead of sending it off to the papers... he might still have a chance at a seat in the next Parliament.... I shall not pretend to be sorry that I have helped Mr. Bowerman, the accredited Labour candidate, to disable an opponent who, if he had played his cards skilfully, might have proved very dangerous... Yours, G. Bernard Shaw

Vivian continued his keen interest in the Balkan states. In 1907, he joined a plot to put Prince Arthur of Connaught on the throne of Serbia. A year later, the Montenegrin government considered appointing him as its Honorary Consul in London, and Vivian wrote to his friend Winston Churchill, asking for an exequatur for his appointment.

In 1908, Vivian proposed a gambling "system" for roulette published in The Evening Standard. His system relied on the gambler's fallacy and it was debunked by Sir Hiram Maxim in the Literary Digest in October 1908.

Vivian continued to publish books in the First World War, notably a 1917 volume, Italy at War, which despite its title was largely a travelogue. He tried to join the Ministry of Information and met both Lord Beaverbrook and John Buchan as part of his efforts, but his services were rejected, although Buchan admitted to Jacobite sympathies during their meeting. Vivian instead returned to the Daily Express as travel correspondent for 1918.

In the 1920s Vivian worked as a travel stringer for newspapers that included The Pall Mall Magazine and The Yorkshire Post. In 1927, he wrote Secret Societies Old and New, which received mixed reviews, The Spectator calling it "well-written and extremely readable", but Albert Mackey noting, "The author does not possess sufficient knowledge for his task."

In 1932, Vivian returned to European political history and legitimism with The Life of the Emperor Charles of Austria, the first biography of Charles published in English. It was positively received in the Belfast News Letter. He continued to write on the Balkans, with an article in The English Review in 1933 on racial tensions in Yugoslavia.

Vivian's writings were noted in his lifetime and after; he is listed in the 1926 edition of Who's Who in Literature, and the 1967 New Century Handbook of English Literature.

Political candidate
In 1889, Vivian sought to stand in the Dover by-election. He withdrew and later alleged that the Irish journalist and candidate for Galway Borough, T. P. O'Connor, had stepped in to prevent his candidacy.

In April 1891, Vivian announced he was standing in the East Bradford constituency for the Jacobite "Individualist Party", of which he was sole member. By May 1891, Vivian was claiming to be the Labour candidate for the seat, though this was denied by the Bradford Trade and Labour Council. During the campaign he was named as co-respondent in a divorce case  which was gleefully reported by the local press. He duly lost the 1892 election to William Sproston Caine.

In 1895, he stood for the North Huntingdonshire constituency on an explicitly Jacobite platform. The seat was comfortably held by A.E. Fellowes.

Undeterred by failures, Vivian again sought election in the 20th century. He was interested in the Deptford constituency, where he had helped Wilfrid Blunt's campaign 15 years earlier. He began to campaign there at the end of 1903 and spoke at a free trade meeting in December, reading letters of support he had received from Winston Churchill and John Dickson-Poynder, MP for Chippenham. Churchill joined the Liberal party in 1904 and Vivian followed him. He was selected as a Liberal candidate to fight the 1906 election, and Churchill spoke in his support at two meetings. Vivian met serious opposition to his candidacy, and received only 726 votes, losing heavily to the Labour Party's C. W. Bowerman.

In 1908, Vivian looked into standing as a candidate in the Stirling Burghs constituency after the death of the former Prime Minister Henry Campbell-Bannerman, who had held the seat for the Liberals. Vivian again espoused legitimist views in support of restoring the House of Stuart. In the end he did not stand and the seat was won by Arthur Ponsonby.

Fascist sympathies
In 1920, Vivian met Benito Mussolini and Gabriele D'Annunzio in Italy and became an admirer of fascism, notably Italian Fascism. In 1926, he wrote of his visits to Mussolini's Italy:
I find most useful, instead of a passport, is a copy of the first Fascist newspaper, for which I wrote an article in 1920... These fascist syndicates everywhere are not unlike the Soviets, and Fascism is very like Bolshevism in many ways. Except that one means well, and the other not. Fascism is certainly succeeding... All the public services go like clockwork, trains arrive to the tick.

In May 1929, Vivian and Hugh George de Willmott Newman founded the Royalist International, a group with a stated aim of opposing the spread of Bolshevism and restoring the Italian monarchy, but with a clear pro-fascist agenda. Vivian was General Secretary and editor of the league's publication, the Royalist International Herald. Newman, 24 at the time, went on to be ordained a bishop in the Independent Catholic church and an archbishop in the Catholicate of the West, and was involved in Aleister Crowley's Ordo Templi Orientis. In 1933, Vivian wrote:
Monarchy...[is] a more satisfactory form of government than the insidious poisons of a plutocracy [and] the distorted democracy of Parliaments... the world's galloping consumption will not be arrested until... Kings forget their ancient animosities to unite in a Royalist International uncontaminated and unhampered by the lying, cowardly, malignant Spirit of the Age.

In 1936 came Vivian's Fascist Italy, in which he expressed admiration for the Italian fascist regime. It received a scathing review in the Nottingham Journal: "A facile writer of travel guides... Herbert Vivian must be read as an amusement of a rather grim sort than as an education.... This is a book which need not be taken too seriously, but which may be worth reading with no more attention than is given to works which claim, as this one does not, to be mainly fiction." The Dundee Evening Telegraph review noted Vivian "writes with rapturous enthusiasm. Mussolini is to him a "saviour", who "restored order and glory and pride, cured his country in her calenture, create an imperial future with traditions of ancient Rome"... Inasmuch as it is a mouthpiece for crude propaganda, Mr. Vivian's book is regrettable."

Political views
Vivian's political views varied over his life, embracing at times one-nation Toryism, free-trade liberalism and open fascism. Indeed, he often seemed more interested in the mechanisms of power and power of persuasive political speech than in consistent policies or positions.

During a failed campaign for the 1891 Bradford East by-election he wrote:
I preach fanatically the gospel of individualism according to John Stuart Mill and Herbert Spencer. The first principle of this gospel is that everyone must be allowed to do whatever he pleases so long as his doing so does not interfere with the liberty of others to do the same. I am a staunch free trader, desiring the abolition of that curse of civilisation, the custom house. I protest against all monopolies, whether exercised by un-wieldy State departments, or by grasping individuals, and I support the claims of all nationalities to the management of their own affairs.

Some of his beliefs were consistent: he held racist views from early days:

He was noted for "extreme monarchist views" throughout his life, and became antagonistic to democracy. His 1933 Kings in Waiting – in which he wrote "Democracy, liberty, and prosperity had been the mirages that had attracted the nations to their shambles" – was noted for its passionate pro-Monarchist and anti-Democratic stance.

He was a prominent British Serbophile and an early proponent of a Greater Serbia that encompassed most of the territory of Macedonia.

Modern perceptions
Vivian's books and articles on Serbia remain widely quoted in modern histories of the region. Slobodan Markovich, writing in 2000, describes Servia: A Poor Man's Paradise''' as a rather sympathetic account of the Serbian King Alexander and the Serbian Army.... Although biased, the book has an abundance of facts and confirms the extent to which British knowledge on Serbia had accumulated in previous decades." Markovich says that Vivian "among Britons who took part in the creation of the image of Serbia and the Balkans" was the "one person [who] should be given a special attention." He also noted put Vivian and anthropologist Edith Durham "among [the] prominent actors of the 'balkanisation' of the Near East", who greatly influenced the British perception of the Balkans after the First World War."

In 2013, Servia: The Poor Man's Paradise was described by Radmila Pejic as "a major contribution to British travel writing about Serbia with its in-depth analysis and rather objective portrayal of the country's political system, religious practices and economic situation."

Although Vivian's Neo-Jacobite views are now largely forgotten, his 1893 wreath-laying earned him the epithet "political maverick" from Smith, who summed up the impact of the event: "The affair enjoyed publicity out of all proportion to the latter-day significance of the Jacobite cause, which had long been effectively extinct, but as one man's crusade against an aspect of state bureaucracy, it acquired contemporary meaning."

Miller and Morelon call him a "monarchist British historian" and ascribe his interest in Emperor Charles of Austria to an uncritical admiration of kings.

Personal life
Vivian at 27 was named as co-respondent in a divorce case. In 1891, he had met Henry Simpson and his wife Maud Mary Simpson in Venice and become a frequent visitor to their home. Henry Simpson was an artist and a friend of Whistler. The Simpsons travelled on to Paris, where Mrs Simpson confessed that Vivian had proposed to her. The Simpsons then returned to London and Mrs Simpson left her husband and demanded a divorce, as she and Vivian were living together in Bognor Regis under the assumed names of Mr and Mrs Selwyn. The Simpsons' divorce came in December 1892, one of only 354 granted in England and Wales that year. On 22 June 1893, Vivian married Simpson. She pursued her ambition to become an actress and in 1895 she travelled to Holland, where she abandoned Vivian for a Mr Sundt of the Norwegian Legation in Amsterdam. The marriage ended in divorce in 1896.

On 30 September 1897, Vivian married Olive Walton, daughter of Frederick Walton the inventor of linoleum. Herbert and Olive were well known on the London social scene in the years just after the First World War and occur in Anthony Powell's memoir Infants of the Spring'' as throwing a lavish luncheon in honour of Aleister Crowley. Powell notes that their "marriage did not last long, but was still going at this period." Olive kept up a lively correspondence with Powell's father for many years after the divorce.

Vivian was made a Knight of the Royal Serbian Order of Takovo in 1902 and a Commander of the Royal Montenegrin Order of Danilo in 1910.

Herbert Vivian died on 18 April 1940 at Gunwalloe in Cornwall,  from his grandfather's house in St Clement.

Works

 (published under a pseudonym)

The following books are commonly attributed to Vivian, but at least one source gives Wilfrid Keppel Honnywill as the author.
 (published anonymously)
 (published anonymously)

Notes

Footnotes

Citations

Bibliography

1865 births
1940 deaths
19th-century British newspaper founders
19th-century English novelists
20th-century British newspaper founders
20th-century English novelists
20th-century British journalists
Alumni of Trinity College, Cambridge
British science fiction writers
English fascists
English Jacobites
English journalists
English travel writers
Jacobite propagandists
Liberal Party (UK) parliamentary candidates
Montenegro–United Kingdom relations
Neo-Jacobite Revival
Oscar Wilde
People educated at Harrow School
Herbert